Kilesapuram is a village in Ibrahimpatnam Mandal, Krishna district, Andhra Pradesh, India. It falls Under the  Mylavaram Assembly constituency and Vijayawada Loksabha constituency. It locates on the ferry of Krishna river.

Demographics

References

Villages in Krishna district